In the branch of mathematics called graph theory, the strength of an undirected graph corresponds to the minimum ratio edges removed/components created in a decomposition of the graph in question. It is a method to compute partitions of the set of vertices and detect zones of high concentration of edges, and is analogous to graph toughness which is defined similarly for vertex removal.

Definitions 

The strength  of an undirected simple graph G = (V, E) admits the three following definitions:

 Also if  is the set of all spanning trees of G, then
 
 And by linear programming duality,

Complexity 

Computing the strength of a graph can be done in polynomial time, and the first such algorithm
was discovered by Cunningham (1985). The algorithm with best complexity for computing exactly the strength is due to Trubin (1993), uses the flow decomposition of Goldberg and Rao (1998), in time .

Properties 

 The Tutte-Nash-Williams theorem:   is the maximum number of edge-disjoint spanning trees that can be contained in G.
 Contrary to the graph partition problem, the partitions output by computing the strength are not necessarily balanced (i.e. of almost equal size).

References 
W. H. Cunningham. Optimal attack and reinforcement of a network, J of ACM, 32:549–561, 1985.
A. Schrijver. Chapter 51. Combinatorial Optimization, Springer, 2003.
V. A. Trubin. Strength of a graph and packing of trees and branchings,, Cybernetics and Systems Analysis, 29:379–384, 1993.

Graph connectivity
Graph invariants